David Henry Hall (born 16 March 1954) is an English former professional footballer who played as a midfielder during the 1970s.

Career
After beginning as a trainee at Sheffield Wednesday, Hall began his senior career at Bradford City, where he made 54 appearances in the Football League between 1975 and 1977. He later played non-League football with Mossley.

References

1954 births
Living people
English footballers
Sheffield Wednesday F.C. players
Bradford City A.F.C. players
Mossley A.F.C. players
English Football League players
Association football midfielders
Footballers from Sheffield
20th-century English people